San Colombano al Lambro is a comune (municipality) in the Metropolitan City of Milan in the Italian region Lombardy, located about  southeast of Milan.
  
San Colombano al Lambro borders the following municipalities: Borghetto Lodigiano, Graffignana, Livraga, Miradolo Terme, Orio Litta, and Chignolo Po, none of which are in the Metropolitan City of Milan.

San Colombano DOC
The commune of San Colombano al Lambro is home to the Denominazione di origine controllata (DOC) wine which includes 100 hectares (250 acres) producing a single red wine. The wine is a blend of 30-45% Croatina, 25-40% Barbera, 5-15% Uva Rara and up to 15% of other local red grape varieties to round out the blend. All grapes destined for DOC wine production need to be harvested to a yield no greater than 11 tonnes/ha. The finished wine must attain a minimum alcohol level of 11% in order to be labelled with the San Colombano DOC designation.

References

External links

 Official website 

Cities and towns in Lombardy